The Temptation of Tavernake is a 1911 novel by the British writer E. Phillips Oppenheim.

Adaption
In 1928 it was adapted into the silent film Sisters of Eve directed by Scott Pembroke and starring Anita Stewart, Betty Blythe and Creighton Hale.

References

Bibliography
 Goble, Alan. The Complete Index to Literary Sources in Film. Walter de Gruyter, 199
 Reilly, John M. Twentieth Century Crime & Mystery Writers. Springer, 2015.

1911 British novels
Novels by E. Phillips Oppenheim
British thriller novels
British novels adapted into films
Hodder & Stoughton books